Puka-Puka Airport is an airport on Puka-Puka in French Polynesia . The airport is 3 km northeast of the village of Teonemahina. The airport is extremely vulnerable to climate change caused sea level rise. The airport only sits 1.5 meters in elevation above sea level, so even with low end climate model predictions, the airport is likely to be flooded.

Airlines and destinations

Passenger

Statistics

References

External links
 

Airports in French Polynesia